Igapophilus is a genus of skipper butterflies in the family Hesperiidae. It has one species Igapophilus rufus.

References

Natural History Museum Lepidoptera genus database

Hesperiinae
Monotypic butterfly genera
Hesperiidae genera